Camille Doucet (16 May 1812 in Paris – 1 April 1895 in Paris) was a French poet and playwright.

Biography 
Camille Doucet was born on 16 May, 1812, in Paris, France.

He was a solicitor's clerk and notary, the secretary of Baron Fain in the cabinet of King Louis-Philippe, then the general manager of theater administration at the ministry of the Emperor's Household in 1863. Several times a candidate for the Académie française, he was elected a member in 1865 and was the permanent secretary from 1876.

As Manager of Theater Administration, in 1867 Camille Doucet authorized the café-concerts "to use costumes, cross-dressing; to perform plays, to have interludes of dance and acrobatics"; these measures would support the further development of large venues, such as the Folies Bergère or the Olympia. Although Flaubert complained of him, he had a reputation for honesty and kindness; the memoirs of Sarah Bernhardt show that he supported her debuts at the Comédie-Française and gave her entry to the Odéon.

Camille Doucet was the author of several poems and numerous plays: vaudevilles, operas, comedies in verse. While some of them were met in their time with success, they are now largely forgotten.

Doucet died on 1 April, 1895, at the age of 82, in Paris, France.

Works
Theater
 A Young Man, a comedy-drama in three acts, in verse, Paris, théâtre de l'Odéon, 29 November 1841
 The Advocate of His Cause, a comedy in one act and in verse, Paris, théâtre de l'Odéon, 5 February 1842
 The Baron de Lafleur, or the Last Valets, a comedy in three acts and in verse, Paris, théâtre de l'Odéon, 13 December 1842
 Hunting Scoundrels, a comedy in three acts and in verse, Paris, Théâtre-Français, 27 February 1846
 The Last Banquet of 1847, comedy-revue in tables 3 and verse, Paris, théâtre de l'Odéon, 30 December 1847
 Enemies of the house, a comedy in three acts, in verse, Paris, Second Théâtre-Français, 6 December 1850
 The Forbidden Fruit, comedy in verse, Paris, Théâtre-Français, 23 November 1857
 The Consideration, a comedy in four acts in verse, Paris, Théâtre-Français, 6 November 1860
Collected Works
 Comedies in verse (1858) Volume 1: The Forbidden Fruit, Enemies of the House, Hunting Scoundrels. Volume 2: The Baron de Lafleur, The Advocate of his Cause, A Young Man and speech in verse.
 Complete Works (1874)

Historical sources
 Octave Pradels, Thirty Years of the Café-Concert: Memories of Paulus (collected, 300 illustrations, 60 songs), Paris, Société d'édition et de publications, 460 p.
 The personal papers of Camille Doucet are kept in the National Archives in document 487AP

External links

References 

1812 births
1895 deaths
Writers from Paris
19th-century French dramatists and playwrights
Members of the Académie Française
Burials at Père Lachaise Cemetery
French male poets
19th-century French poets
19th-century French male writers